The O'Reilly Auto Parts 150 at Mid-Ohio is a NASCAR Camping World Truck Series race that is held at the Mid-Ohio Sports Car Course road course in Lexington, Ohio. Parker Kligerman is the defending winner of this race.

It is one of three standalone races on the Truck Series schedule, the others being the Corn Belt 150 at Knoxville Raceway and the TSport 200 at Lucas Oil Indianapolis Raceway Park. This race is held on the same weekend as the Cup Series' Quaker State 400 and the Xfinity Series' Alsco Uniforms 250, both at Atlanta Motor Speedway. A race for the main ARCA Menards Series will be held at Mid-Ohio on the same weekend as this race.

History
The 2022 Truck Series schedule was released on September 29 with Mid-Ohio on Saturday, July 9. The track was given the race as a result of losing their Xfinity Series race to Portland International Raceway. Both the Mid-Ohio and Portland road courses are owned and operated by Green Savoree Racing Promotions. It was the first time that Green Savoree had a total of two NASCAR national series races in any series.

This race became an additional 23rd race on the Truck Series schedule. The series had 23 races in 2020 but only 22 races in 2021 as a result of the race at Iowa Speedway not being replaced with another race.

The race will be 151 miles and 67 laps long according to NASCAR.com. Each of the stages will be 25 laps in length.

On May 5, 2022, O'Reilly Auto Parts was announced as the title sponsor of the race. Also, "at Mid-Ohio" is part of the official name of the race (similar to races at Watkins Glen International where "at The Glen" is part of the names of the track's races), making the name of the race the "O'Reilly Auto Parts 150 at Mid-Ohio".

Past winners

References

External links
 

NASCAR Truck Series races
Annual sporting events in the United States
NASCAR races at Mid-Ohio Sports Car Course